Annie McGuire is an American sitcom starring Mary Tyler Moore that aired on CBS from October 26 to December 28, 1988.

Premise
Newlyweds Annie and Nick McGuire both have kids from previous marriages and are trying to balance their jobs (She in politics, he in engineering). The couple must also deal with their parents who are on opposite political sides.

Cast
Mary Tyler Moore as Annie McGuire
Denis Arndt as Nick McGuire
Eileen Heckart as Emma Block
John Randolph as Red McGuire
Adrien Brody as Lenny McGuire
Cynthia Marie King as Debbie McGuire
Bradley Warden as Lewis Block

Episodes

References

External links

1988 American television series debuts
1988 American television series endings
1980s American sitcoms
English-language television shows
Television shows set in New York City
CBS original programming
Television series by MTM Enterprises